Yvonne Frost (born 1931) is a Wiccan author, lecturer, and practitioner from Los Angeles. Together with her late husband Gavin Frost, she founded the Church and School of Wicca in 1968. She has co-written many books with him, and appeared on the Phil Donahue Show, PM Magazine, and Tom Snyder's Tomorrow Show. Together, they lead workshops at many events in the Neo-Pagan community such as Stones Rising, Sirius Rising, Pagan Pride Day, and the Starwood Festival.

Bibliography
 Frost, Gavin and Yvonne Frost (2004). The Solitary Wiccan - Weiser Books , .
 Frost, Yvonne and Gavin Frost (1985). Astral Travel: Your Guide to the Secrets of Out-of-Body Experiences - Weiser Books; New Ed edition , .
 Frost, Gavin and Yvonne Frost (2003).  A Witch's Guide to Psychic Healing: Applying Traditional Therapies, Rituals, and Systems - Red Wheel/Weiser , .
 Frost, Gavin and Yvonne Frost (1991). The Prophet's Bible - Red Wheel Weiser , .
 Frost, Gavin and Yvonne Frost (1999). Magic Power of White Witchcraft Revised - Prentice Hall Press; Revised edition , .
 Frost, Gavin and Yvonne Frost (1989). Tantric Yoga: The Royal Path to Raising Kundalini Power - Weiser Books , .
 Frost, Gavin and Yvonne Frost (2000). The Witch's Magical Handbook - Prentice Hall Press , .
 Frost, Gavin and Yvonne Frost (1999). Good Witch's Bible - Godolphin House; Reprint edition , .
 Frost, Gavin and Yvonne Frost (1977). The Magic Power of Witchcraft - Prentice Hall Press 
 Frost, Gavin and Yvonne Frost (1978). Meta-Psychometry: Key to Power & Abundance - Parker Pub Co , 
 Frost, Gavin and Yvonne Frost (1979). A Witch's Grimoire of Ancient Omens. Portents, Talismans, Amulets, & Charms - Parker Pub Co , 
 Frost, Gavin and Yvonne Frost (2006). Good Witches Fly Smoothly: Surviving Witchcraft - Outskirts Press , 
 Frost, Gavin and Yvonne Frost (1980). Power Secrets from a Sorcerer's Private Magnum Arcanum - Parker Pub , 
 Frost, Gavin and Yvonne Frost (2002). The Witch's Book of Magical Ritual - Reward Books 
 Frost, Gavin and Yvonne Frost, Ibn Saud (1980). Helping Yourself with Astromancy - Parker Pub Co

References

 Bond, Lawrence & Ellen Evert Hopman (1996) People of the Earth: The New Pagans Speak Out (reissued as Being a Pagan: Druids, Wiccans & Witches Today in 2002 Destiny Books ) Interview.
 Jarboe, Michelle (Apr. 9, 2007) Wiccans Gather to Celebrate Faith News-Record.com article

External links
 Biography at the Church and School of Wicca website

Living people
American occult writers
American Wiccans
1931 births
Wiccan writers